is an anime television spin-off series Astro Boy franchise created by Osamu Tezuka. Aimed at preschoolers, the series was produced by Tezuka Productions and Yomiuri TV Enterprises in partnership with Nigerian broadcaster Channels TV.

Consisting of eight 11-minute episodes, the series ran in English on Channels TV's children's block of programming between March 22, 2014 and April 26, 2014. It later received a bilingual DVD release in Japan on November 3, 2015.

Production
At the 2013 Annecy International Animated Film Festival, Tezuka Productions revealed that they were in early negotiations to create local adaptations of Astro Boy with international companies. The furthest along was a partnership with Nigeria's Channels TV, with whom Tezuka were looking to "re-version" the brand with. The international focus, which was made in part as a response to declining birth rates in Japan, was spearheaded by Makoto Tezuka and was hoped to receive funding from the Cool Japan initiative.

The following January, Tezuka Productions officially announced the series. Described as "edutainment" aimed at preschool children, Little Astro Boy was greenlit for 8 episodes with the intention to focus on the lead's innocence, rather than might. While primarily produced by Tezuka in Japan, as part of being an international co-production, three Nigerian animators traveled to Japan to animate two sequences.

Voice cast

Episodes

References

External links
Tezuka Productions page 
Happinet Pictures page 

Astro Boy
2014 anime television series debuts
2010s preschool education television series
Animated preschool education television series
Animated television series about children
Japanese children's animated action television series
Japanese children's animated space adventure television series
Japanese children's animated comic science fiction television series
Japanese children's animated superhero television series
Action anime and manga
Adventure anime and manga
Osamu Tezuka anime
Science fiction anime and manga
Comedy anime and manga
Androids in television